"There Was An Old Woman" may refer to:

Nursery rhyme
 "There was an Old Woman Who Lived in a Shoe", a popular English language nursery rhyme
 "There Was an Old Woman Who Lived Under a Hill", a nursery rhyme which dates back to at least its first known printing in 1714

Other
 There Was an Old Woman (novel), 1943 mystery novel by Ellery Queen
 "There Was an Old Woman Who Swallowed a Fly", 1950s children's song by Alan Mills
 "There Was an Old Woman" (The Twilight Zone), 1988 The Twilight Zone television episode

See also
 Old woman (disambiguation)